Walter Duncan may refer to:

 Walter Leslie Duncan (1883–1947), Australian politician
 Walter Gordon Duncan (1885–1963), politician in South Australia
 Walter Hughes Duncan (1848–1906), pastoralist and politician in South Australia
 Walter Jack Duncan (1881–1941), United States Army war artist
 Walter Duncan (painter) (1848–1932), British painter
 J. Walter Duncan, American businessman